ŠK Svätý Jur (English: St George Football Club) is a Slovak football team, based in the town of Svätý Jur. The club was founded in 1921 and their local rivals are PŠC Pezinok.

Current squad 
As of 25 February 2018

For recent transfers, see List of Slovak football transfers winter 2016–17.

Notable players 
Had international caps for their respective countries. Players whose name is listed in bold represented their countries while playing for ŠK.

 Henrich Benčík
 Mário Breška
 Peter Doležaj
 František Plach

References

External links 
 Official Website
 futbalnet.sk 
 futbalbfz.sk 
 ligy.sk 

Svaty Jur
Pezinok District
Association football clubs established in 1921
1921 establishments in Slovakia